Kerstin-Oudekki Loone (born 5 February 1979 in Tartu) is an Estonian politician and political scientist. She is a member of XIII and XIV Riigikogu.

In 2003, she graduated from Tartu University with specialities in mathematics and philosophy. In 2005 she graduated from Tallinn University in political sciences.

In 2007, she was a short-term observer of OSCE Election Observation Mission, taking place in Kyrgyzstan.

In 2016, she was the Secretary General of the Estonian Centre Party.

Since 2013, she is a member of the Estonian Centre Party.

In January 2022 she nominated Julian Assange for the Nobel Peace Prize.

References

Living people
1979 births
Estonian Centre Party politicians
Estonian political scientists
Members of the Riigikogu, 2015–2019
Members of the Riigikogu, 2019–2023
Women members of the Riigikogu
Hugo Treffner Gymnasium alumni
University of Tartu alumni
Tallinn University alumni
People from Tartu
Politicians from Tartu
21st-century Estonian women politicians